Yuri Mikhailovich Gritsenko (born November 6, 1961), known as The Zelenograd Chikatilo, is a Russian serial killer who committed 4 brutal murders in his home city of Zelenograd in the first few months of 2001.

Biography 
Since childhood, Yuri Gritsenko grew up a closed and unsociable person. His father was a carpenter, while his mother was a strong and strict woman. Psychiatrists are confident that this led to the development of a misogynistic complex in Gritsenko. After serving in the army, Gritsenko began working for the militsiya (Soviet police), believing that his profession would quash his self-doubt. He soon married and had two children born, but the complex persisted. Understanding this, Gritsenko became addicted to alcohol. During this time, everything negative splashed out of him, which, in the end, turned him into a murderer. After some time, he was fired from the police forces for his drunkenness, after which he committed a murder and received 8 years of imprisonment. According to the killer, his victim was a prostitute who wanted to rob him, and which he killed her with a blow from a frying pan. When Gritsenko returned from the colony, his family was almost completely broken up.

Since the beginning of April 2001, Gritsenko began attacking women. He struck his victims with a hammer, causing traumatic brain injuries. In just three days in April, he attacked five women, two of which the doctors couldn't save. The survivors couldn't describe the criminal, since he always struck from behind. Gritsenko committed all his attacks in Zelenograd's urban forest during the day, when people were returning from work. He loved to walk around in the park, especially in the area of Lake Chernoe. He temporarily laid low for a while, but in August he resumed his attacks. During this time, he inflicted severe head injuries on four women. Local newspapers began pressuring the authorities, and facial composites were hung throughout Zelenograd.

By the beginning of autumn, Gritsenko had committed 4 murders and 5 attempted murders in Zelenograd Forest Park. At the time, he again laid low, but on October 19, 2001, he attacked another woman, this time in the Northern Administrative Okrug of Moscow. Within a week, he beat three more women with a hammer. But soon one of the victims resisted him, snatching the hammer away and escaping her assailant. She then clearly described her attacker's appearance.

On November 19, 2001, the killer was detained during another attack on a woman in Moscow's Friendship Park. To her help suddenly came a young man, who heard her cries. Gritsenko, leaving the seriously injured woman, pounced with the hammer on her saviour, but couldn't kill him. Anatoly Sukhov, who was a bus driver, wounded the killer and waited for the arrival of the authorities. During the eight months of his criminal activities, Gritsenko had committed 4 murders and 10 attempted murders on women. He soon admitted to his crimes. A forensic psychiatric examination in April 2002 found him fully sane. In the summer of 2002, the Moscow City Court sentenced Yuri Gritsenko to 22 years imprisonment, with the Supreme Court of Russia upholding the sentence.

In the media 
 Documentary film from the series "Documentary Detective" - 'Zelenograd Chikatilo'

See also
 List of Russian serial killers

References 
 Yuri Gritsenko
 Comrade Sukhov declared war on the bandits

1961 births
Living people
Male serial killers
People from Zelenograd
Russian serial killers
Serial killers who worked in law enforcement